Massimiliano Alvini (born 20 April 1970) is an Italian football coach. He was most recently head coach of Cremonese in the Italian Serie A.

Playing career
As a player, Alvini was a defender who spent his entire short career in the amateur leagues of his native Tuscany, first with Firenze Ovest and then with Signa, before retiring in 2000 due to an injury.

Coaching career
After retirement, Alvini stayed at Signa as a director of football, then as a youth coach, and finally as a head coach. Under his tenure, Signa won promotion to Eccellenza before leaving for Quarrata, guiding them to a spot in the Serie D promotion playoffs and, on a second stint in 2006, promotion to Eccellenza following the club's relegation a year earlier.

In 2009 Alvini was hired as the new head coach of Promozione amateurs Tuttocuoio; under his seven-year tenure in charge of the small Tuscan club, Alvini won an impressive total of four promotions (from Promozione to Lega Pro), as well as a Regional Amateur Coppa Italia in 2009 and the Coppa Italia Dilettanti in 2010, leading to comparisons between him and his personal friend Maurizio Sarri, who also started his career from the regional amateur leagues of Tuscany.

In 2015 he left Tuttocuoio to accept an offer from Lega Pro club Pistoiese, being however sacked on 12 April 2016 due to poor results.

On 11 August 2016 Alvini was appointed as the new head coach of Lega Pro club AlbinoLeffe. After impressive results on his first two seasons and a contract extension in March 2017, he was sacked in November 2018 due to a dismal start in the 2018–19 Serie C campaign.

On 18 June 2019, Alvini signed a one-year contract with Reggiana (still formally called Reggio Audace at that time) as their new head coach following the club's readmission to Serie C. On the club's first Serie C season, Alvini managed to lead them to a promotion playoff spot and eventually winning promotion to Serie B after defeating Bari in the tournament final. For his achievements as Reggiana boss, Alvini was awarded the Panchina d'Oro prize as Serie C's best manager of the season.

Alvini was successively confirmed in charge of Reggiana for the club's 2020–21 Serie B, their first appearance in the Italian second tier in 21 years; he voluntarily left the club by the end of the season after being immediately relegated back to Serie C, despite having been publicly offered to stay in charge of the team.

On 16 June 2021, recently promoted Serie B club Perugia announced Alvini as their new head coach on a two-year deal following the departure of their previous boss Fabio Caserta. Under his guidance, Perugia completed the season in eighth place, qualifying to the promotion playoffs, where they were eliminated in the first round by Brescia after extra time. On 8 June 2022, Perugia announced to have terminated Alvini's contract by mutual consent.

On 9 June 2022, one day after his departure from Perugia, Alvini was unveiled as the new head coach of newly promoted Serie A club Cremonese, with whom he is set to make his debut in the Italian top flight. He was however sacked on 14 January 2023, following a 2–3 home loss to Monza, leaving Cremonese at the bottom of the league table with seven points and no wins in eighteen games in charge of the Grigiorossi.

Honours

Manager
Tuttocuoio
 Coppa Italia Dilettanti: 2010
 Serie D: 2012–13 (Girone D)

Individual
 Panchina d'Oro: 2020

References

1970 births
Living people
People from Fucecchio
Italian footballers
Italian football managers
U.S. Pistoiese 1921 managers
U.C. AlbinoLeffe managers
A.C. Reggiana 1919 managers
A.C. Perugia Calcio managers
U.S. Cremonese managers
Association football defenders
Serie C managers
Serie B managers
Sportspeople from the Metropolitan City of Florence
Footballers from Tuscany